The Xerox Operating System (XOS) was an operating system for the XDS Sigma series of computers "optimized for direct replacement of IBM DOS/360 installations" and to provide real-time and timesharing support.

The system was developed, beginning in 1969, for Xerox by the French firm CII (now Bull).

XOS was more successful in Europe than in the US, but was unable to compete with IBM. By 1972 there were 35 XOS installations in Europe, compared to 2 in the US.

References

External links
 XOS Documentation at Bitsavers
 XOS: the Xerox operating system, general information digest

Discontinued operating systems
Proprietary operating systems
Operating System